Unión Deportiva Logroñés, S.A.D. is a Spanish football team based in Logroño, in the autonomous community of La Rioja. Founded in 2009, it currently plays in Primera División RFEF – Group 2, holding home matches at Estadio Las Gaunas, with a capacity of 16,000 seats.

History

Unión Deportiva Logroñés was founded in 2009 after the extinction of CD Logroñés, occupying the seat of CD Varea, recently promoted to Segunda División B. They comfortably maintained their place in the division in their first season, (2009–10), and their reserve team, UD Logroñés B, finished in third position in the regional championship, thus promoting to Tercera División. UD Logroñés reached 5th place in the 2011–12 season.

In 2016 the club made a 3-year collaboration agreement with SD Eibar, with their players going on loan to Logroñés for experience with the aim of achieving promotion due to the additional talent in the squad.  Being in Segunda División B, UD Logroñés finished 6th in the 2016–17 season. One of the first to make the move was goalkeeper Jon Ander. In the next season, the club finished 7th in Group 2, and in the 2018–19 season the club finished as runners-up of their group

The 2019–20 season was curtailed, due to the COVID-19 pandemic in Spain, when the team was leading Group 2. On 18 July 2020, the season recommenced with the promotion playoffs to Segunda División, and UD Logroñés achieved promotion after beating Castellón in a penalty shootout.

Season to season

1 season in Segunda División
2 seasons in Primera División RFEF
11 seasons in Segunda División B

Current squad
.

Reserve team

Stadium
Logroñés plays home games at Estadio Las Gaunas. It has a capacity of 16,000 spectators, and its pitch measures 104 x 66 meters.

See also
UD Logroñés B, reserve team

References

External links 
Official website 
Futbolme team profile 

 
Football clubs in La Rioja (Spain)
Sport in Logroño
Association football clubs established in 2009
2009 establishments in Spain
Segunda División clubs
Primera Federación clubs